The 1956 Tour de Suisse was the 20th edition of the Tour de Suisse cycle race and was held from 16 June to 23 June 1956. The race started and finished in Zürich. The race was won by Rolf Graf.

General classification

References

1956
1956 in Swiss sport
1956 Challenge Desgrange-Colombo